The Pauline Family is a Roman Catholic congregation of nine institutes of consecrated life (religious and aggregated institutes) and an association of lay collaborators. it was founded by Blessed James Alberione in 1914.

Mission
The Pauline mission is to give the whole Christ, Jesus, master, way, Truth and life to the world by using all suitable means of modern media and more generally to address the spiritual needs of the modern world in a modern way.

Members
The worldwide Pauline family consists of:

Five religious institutes
 Society of St. Paul
 Daughters of St. Paul
 Sister Disciples of the Divine Master
 Sisters of Jesus the Good Shepherd
 Sisters of Mary Queen of Apostles

Four aggregated institutes
 Institute of Jesus Priest
 Institute of Gabriel the Archangel
 Institute of Our Lady’s Annunciation 
 Institute of the Holy Family

One association of lay collaborators
 Association of Pauline Cooperators

Saints and Blesseds
 Blessed James Alberione, founder of the Pauline Family
Blessed Giuseppe Giaccardo (Timoteo) (1896-1948), Professed Priest of the Society of Saint Paul
 Venerable Maggiorino Vigolungo (1904-1918), Seminarian of the Society of Saint Paul 
 Venerable Francesco Chiesa (1874-1946), Priest of the Diocese of Alba
 Venerable Andrea Maria Borello (1916-1948), Professed Religious of the Society of Saint Paul
 Venerable Maria Teresa Merlo (Tecla) (1894-1964), Cofounder of the Daughters of Saint Paul 
 Venerable Orsola Maria Rivata (Maria Scholastica of Divine Providence) (1897-1987), Professed Religious of the Pious Disciples of the Divine Master
 Servant of God Stefano Lamera (1912-1997), Professed Priest of the Society of Saint Paul
 Servants of God Francesco Ugenti (1913-1998) and Teresa Sivilli Ugenti (1914-1984), Married Couple of the Diocese of Bari-Bitento; Member of the Institute of the Holy Family
 Servant of God Bernardo Antonini (1932-2002), Priest of the Diocese of Verona; Professed Member of the Secular Institute of Jesus the Priest
 Servant of God Justin Daniel Bataclan (1986-2007), Seminarian of the Society of Saint Paul; Martyr

See also
Order of Saint Paul the First Hermit
Paulists

External links
Pauline Family on website of the Society of St. Paul